Joshua Hope (born 7 January 1998) is an Australian former professional footballer who currently plays as an attacking midfielder for Green Gully SC in NPL Victoria.

Club career
On 5 February 2015, Hope became the first Tasmanian in 23 years to receive an Australian Institute of Sport football scholarship; Hope turned down an NPL Victoria 1 contract with Melbourne Victory to accept the offer from the FFA Centre of Excellence.

In July 2016, Hope made his unofficial senior debut for Melbourne Victory as a substitute in their International Champions Cup match against Juventus F.C.

On 9 August 2017, Hope made his professional debut against Brisbane Roar in the FFA Cup as an 80th minute substitute for James Troisi. On 19 September 2017, he signed a professional contract with Melbourne Victory, and made his league debut in a Big Blue, replacing Leroy George in the 65th minute against Sydney FC on 7 October 2017.

On 2 November 2020, Hope announced that he was stepping away from professional football due to online abuse.

In 2022, Hope returned to playing football in the National Premier Leagues Victoria for Green Gully SC. Making his official debut in Green Gully SC's Round 1 3–2 win against the Oakleigh Cannons FC in which he scored 1 goal in the 43rd minute and was substituted off in the 74th minute being replaced by Ethan Brooks.

International career
On the 6 September 2015, Hope was selected as captain for the U-17 Joeys pre World Cup tour of France and was later a member of their FIFA U-17 World Cup squad in Chile.

On 2 September 2016, Hope was selected as part of a 23-man Young Socceroos squad for the 2016 AFF U-19 Youth Championship in Vietnam.

Career statistics

Club

Honours

Club
Melbourne Victory
 A-League Championship: 2017–18

International 
Australia U20
 AFF U-19 Youth Championship: 2016

References

1998 births
Living people
Australian soccer players
Association football midfielders
Melbourne Victory FC players
A-League Men players
National Premier Leagues players